The 2000 Caribbean Football Union Women's Championship was the inaugural Women's international football tournament to take place in the Caribbean region. The tournament was organised by the Caribbean Football Union.

Thirteen countries entered the competition, although co-hosts Trinidad and Tobago withdrew before playing a game.

Participants

Preliminary round

Group stage

The group stage was referred to as the 'semi final round'.

Group 1

Original scheduled to take place between 12–16 July 2000, the group games took place in August.

  withdrew

Group 2

Originally scheduled for 11–16 August and to be hosted in Trinidad & Tobago. Group 2 was cancelled. Instead a "Final Round" would occur in place of Group 2 and the Final.

The teams drawn in this group were:

Final round

The games took place in November 2000 in Castries, St. Lucia.

See also
 CFU Women's Caribbean Cup
 2014 CFU Women's Caribbean Cup

References

CFU Women's Caribbean Cup
Women
International association football competitions hosted by Haiti
International association football competitions hosted by Saint Lucia
Carib